The Cleveland Park Neighborhood Library is a branch of the District of Columbia Public Library in the Cleveland Park neighborhood of Washington, D.C. It is located at 3310 Connecticut Avenue NW. A library building opened on the site in 1953 and was replaced in 2018 by a larger facility that was built at a cost of $19.7 million. The new library's design garnered praise and plaudits; DCist described it as "strikingly stylish" and it won the 2019 Urban Catalyst award from the local chapter of the American Institute of Architects.

References

External links 

 Official website

Cleveland Park
Public libraries in Washington, D.C.